The 2021–22 Thai League 2 is the 24th season of the Thai League 2, the second-tier professional league for Thailand's association football clubs, since its establishment in 1997, also known as M-150 Championship due to the sponsorship deal with M-150. A total of 18 teams will compete in the league. The season is scheduled to begin on 14 August 2021 and is scheduled to conclude on 22 May 2022.

For this season two teams in the final table (champion and runner up) directly promoted to Thai League 1 next season while teams ranked 3rd - 6th qualified in play off for last spot in top tier next season.

The 1st transfer window is from 4 May 2021 to 27 July 2021 while the 2nd transfer window is from 8 December 2021 to 4 January 2022.

Team changes
The following teams have changed division since the 2020–21 season.

To Thai League 2

 Lamphun Warriors
 Muangkan United
 Rajpracha

 Sukhothai
 Trat
 Rayong

From Thai League 2

 Nongbua Pitchaya
 Chiangmai United
 Khonkaen United

  Samut Sakhon
  Sisaket
  Uthai Thani

Renamed Clubs
 MOF Customs United renamed to Customs Ladkrabang United

Teams

Stadium and locations

Personnel
Note: Flags indicate national team as has been defined under FIFA eligibility rules. Players may hold more than one non-FIFA nationality; Club dissolved during season would shown by grey background.

Foreign Players
Players name in bold indicates the player was registered during the mid-season transfer window.

League table

Standings

Promotion play-offs

Semi-finals

Lampang won 4–1 on aggregate.

Trat won 2–1 on aggregate.

Finals

5–5 on aggregate. Lampang won on away goals.

Positions by round

Results by round

Results

Season statistics

Top scorers
As of 30 April 2022.

Hat-tricks

Clean sheets
As of 30 April 2022.

Awards

Monthly awards

Attendances

Overall statistical table

Attendances by home match played

See also 
 2021–22 Thai League 1
 2021–22 Thai League 3
 2021–22 Thailand Amateur League
 2021–22 Thai FA Cup
 2021–22 Thai League Cup
 2021 Thailand Champions Cup

References

External links
 Official website 
 Football Association of Thailand 

Thai League 2 seasons
2021 in Thai football leagues
Thai